FC Ikva Mlyniv is an amateur Ukrainian football club from Mlyniv, Rivne Oblast. It plays in the Rivne Oblast Championship (season 2018–19).

League and cup history

{|class="wikitable"
|-bgcolor="#efefef"
! Season
! Div.
! Pos.
! Pl.
! W
! D
! L
! GS
! GA
! P
!Domestic Cup
!colspan=2|Europe
!Notes
|}

External links
 Revival of football in Mlyniv (Відродження футболу у Млинові). Rivne Oblast Football Federation. 8 July 2015
 Volodymyr Kovalenko. Serhiy Vyshenskyi: "Viliya" wants by the example of famous "Ajax" develop its club's pyramid (Сергій Вишневський: "Вілія" хоче на прикладі знаменитого "Аякса" вибудувати свою клубну піраміду")''. Footboom. 30 April 2018

 
Ikva Mlyniv, FC
Football clubs in Rivne Oblast